Marian Einbacher (8 January 1900 – 12 January 1943) was a Polish footballer. He played in one match for the Poland national football team in 1921. A Jew, he was killed in the Auschwitz concentration camp during World War II.

References

External links
 
 

1900 births
1943 deaths
Polish footballers
Poland international footballers
Association football forwards
Footballers from Poznań
Polish Jews who died in the Holocaust
Polish people who died in Auschwitz concentration camp
Warta Poznań players